Jimmi Klitland (born 19 February 1982) is a Danish professional football player, who last played for Hvidovre IF.

He is now out of contract.

External links
 Danish national team profile

Living people
1982 births
Danish men's footballers
Brøndby IF players
Køge Boldklub players
BK Skjold players
Ølstykke FC players
Vejle Boldklub players
Boldklubben Frem players
Association football goalkeepers